Pogona is a genus of reptiles containing six lizard species which are often known by the common name bearded dragons. The name "bearded dragon" refers to the underside of the throat (or "beard") of the lizard, which can turn black and gain weight for a number of reasons, most often as a result of stress, or if they feel threatened.  They are a semi-arboreal species, spending significant amounts of time on branches, in bushes, and near human habitation. Pogona species bask on rocks and exposed branches in the mornings and afternoons. Their diet consists primarily of insects, vegetation, and occasionally small rodents. They are found throughout much of Australia and inhabit environments such as deserts, and shrublands .

Description 

The genus Pogona is in the subfamily Amphibolurinae of the lizard family Agamidae. Bearded dragons are characterized by their broad, triangular heads, flattened bodies, and rows and clusters of spiny scales covering their entire bodies. When threatened, bearded dragons will puff up their bodies and beards to ward off predators and make their somewhat dull spikes seem somewhat more dangerous. Bearded dragons display a hand-waving gesture to show submission (most often when acknowledging another bearded dragon's territory), and a head-bobbing display to show dominance between dragons. Some have the ability to slightly change colour during rivalry challenges between males, in response to ambient temperature changes such as turning black to absorb heat, and other stimuli.

Habitat 
Bearded dragons originate from deserts and other dry areas in Australia, with the various species occupying slightly overlapping areas of the landmass. They live in the arid and subtropical woodlands, scrublands, savannas, shore areas, and into the great interior deserts. Their range extends throughout the interior of the eastern states to the eastern half of South Australia and southeastern Northern Territory.  They are considered to be semi-arboreal and will quite readily climb and bask at height. This is also linked to dominance behavior and competition for territory/basking areas. They can be found on fallen/broken trees, rocky outcrops and bushes when basking.

Bearded dragons go through a type of hibernation called brumation. Brumation is like hibernation where reptiles go months without eating but they sporadically drink water. Reptiles go dormant in the hottest temperatures, but it differs from brumation during cooler temperatures. When temperatures are extreme, there is a very small range between temperatures that the reptile's bodies can stay active and where their body cannot tolerate the extreme heat and they die. Bearded dragons go through brumation when the temperature goes below 15.5–21 °C (60–70 °F) during the night and 24–26.5 °C (75–80 °F) during the day for eight to ten hours. When the climate is too hot they will often burrow underground. They will also form more permanent burrows or covered hiding places to use as protection from the climate changes at night and predation.

Behavior 
Adult bearded dragons are very territorial. As they grow, they establish territories in which displays of aggression and appeasement form a normal part of their social interactions. A dominant male will adopt a dominant stance and sometimes ready himself for a fight to attack a male aggressor to defend territory, food sources, or in competition for a female. Any male approaching without displaying submissive behavior will be seen as a challenge for 
territory. Aggressive males have even been known to attack females who do not display submissive gestures in return.

Correspondingly, adult male bearded dragons can bite more forcefully than adult females and this difference is associated with greater head dimensions.

The bearded dragon comes in many different colors. The beard itself is used for mating and aggression displays, as well as heat management. It forms part of a range of gestures and signals through which the dragons have basic levels of communication. Both sexes have a beard, but males display more frequently, especially in courtship rituals. Females also display their beard as a sign of aggression. The beard darkens, sometimes turning jet black, and inflates during the display. The bearded dragon may also open its mouth and gape in addition to inflating its beard to appear more intimidating. Extreme behavior such as hissing can be observed when threatened with a predator, inflating the body and tilting towards the threat in defense. Bearded dragons have relatively strong jaws but will often only attack as a last resort when threatened outside of competition with their own species.

Head bobbing is another behavior seen in both females and males; they quickly move their heads up and down, often darkening and flaring their beard. Changes in the pace of head bobbing are thought to be a form of communication. Males head bob to impress females, and a male will often have to demonstrate his dominance when attempting to mate before the female will concede. Smaller males will often respond to larger male's heads bobbing by arm-waving, which is a submissive sign. Females will also arm wave to avoid aggression, often in response to a male's head bobbing. Female bearded dragons have been seen lowering themselves towards the ground and intermittently arm-waving whilst moving away from a dominant male in an attempt to either appease or escape.

The bearded dragon has also been shown to perceive illusion, specifically the Delboeuf illusion. In an experiment at the University of Padova, bearded dragons were presented with two different-sized plates with the same amount of food. The bearded dragons chose the smaller plate more often than they chose the larger one, showing that they were able to perceive the illusion and interpret that a larger plate does not always mean more food. This is the first evidence of this behavior being shown in a reptile species.

Reproduction 
When brumation comes to an end the male bearded dragon goes out to find a mate. A courtship ritual occurs where the male starts bobbing his head, waving his arms, and stomping his feet in front of the female. The male chases the female and will bite the back of her neck and hold on while he gets in position to copulate.

During the breeding period, female bearded dragons can store sperm in the oviductal crypts. This allows the female bearded dragon to lay a clutch of 11–30 eggs twice from one mating.

Bearded dragons exhibit temperature sex determination. This means that while the embryo is developing, higher temperatures cause dragons with a male genotype to experience sex reversal and express a female phenotype. This produces a bearded dragon that is a female but still has a male genotype. Incubation temperatures above 31 degrees Celsius can cause sex reversal, and the likelihood of sex reversal has a positive correlation with temperature up until 36 degrees Celsius. Incubation temperatures below 31 degrees Celsius cannot trigger sex reversal. Surprisingly, female bearded dragons with a male genotype do not have many differences from genotypic females. According to one study done on bite force, male bearded dragons have a higher bite force than genotypic females, and sex reversed females. However, there was no difference between genotypic females and sex reversed females.

Congenital defects 
During the development of an embryo, abnormalities may result in birth defects. These abnormalities might be caused by chromosomal disorders, chemicals, or other genetic or environmental factors.

 Bicephalism
 Bicephalism is when a bearded dragon is born with two heads and one body.
 Anasarca
 Anasarca is when a bearded dragon is swollen within the egg. Observing eggs in the incubator, an anasarca egg will appear to be sweating. The cause of this is not known. 
 Shistosomus reflexa
 Shistosomus reflexa is when the organs of a bearded dragon develop outside of the body.
 Spinal and limb defects
 Spinal and limb defects are abnormalities in the spine, tail, limbs, or toes. This occurs when there are nutritional deficiencies, trauma, or temperature issues during the development of the affected area. 
 Micropthalmia/anopthalmia
 Micropthalmia/anopthalmia is when a bearded dragon is born with small eye(s) or no eye(s). The cause of these defects is a traumatic event or an environmental event that occurred during the development of the eyes. 
 Hermaphroditism
 Hermaphroditism is when the reproductive organs of both male and female are present. Bearded dragons born with both reproductive organs are infertile.

Species 
The following six species are recognised as being valid.
Pogona barbata  – Eastern bearded dragon
Pogona henrylawsoni  – Rankin's dragon, Lawson's dragon, black-soil bearded dragon, dumpy dragon, dwarf bearded dragon
Pogona microlepidota  – Kimberley bearded dragon, Drysdale river bearded dragon
Pogona minor  – Western bearded dragon, dwarf bearded dragon
Pogona nullarbor  – Nullarbor bearded dragon
Pogona vitticeps  – Central bearded dragon or inland bearded dragon

Nota bene: A binomial authority in parentheses indicates that the species was originally described under a different binomial.

In captivity 

The central bearded dragon is the most common species in captivity, as well as one of the most popular pet reptiles, with some smaller species such as Pogona henrylawsoni being used as substitutes where there is less housing space available.

Introduced into the U.S. as pets during the 1990s, bearded dragons are a species that have gained much popularity as an exotic pet. This popularity has been sustained, even after Australia banned the sale of its wildlife as pets in the 1960s. Generally, the bearded dragon is a solitary animal. Male bearded dragons are usually housed alone, as they will fight with other males and breed with females. They have been known to live up to about 15 years in captivity, and the current world record is 18 years.

Through selective breeding, there are many different versions of the central bearded dragon; these are referred to as "morphs". There are a few main genetic traits, including "hypomelanism" and "translucent", which refer to traits physically displayed by the dragon. Bearded dragons with hypomelanism (or hypos) tend to have lighter and more vibrant coloration. Translucents (or trans) have a less opaque quality to their skin, making their colors seem stronger, and have black eyes. There are also "leatherbacks" (reduced scale texture to give a smoother skin), "silkbacks" (softer outer skin) and "German giants" (larger than average). Silkbacks in particular require special care as they have far more delicate skin, and as such, require different UV and humidity requirements. They also tend to live shorter lifespans.

Captive diet 

Juvenile and baby bearded dragon diets consist mainly of insects, and they require substantial amounts of protein. A juvenile bearded dragon eats insects three times a day on average. After a few feedings, the dragon's usual appetite can be determined. Crickets and dubia roaches are the most popular insects fed to bearded dragons, but they can also be fed other insects such as black soldier fly larvae, spiders, locusts, superworms, silkworms, butterworms, fruit flies, grasshoppers, mealworms and hornworms. Bearded dragons also eat increasing amounts of plant-based food as they grow; adults should have a diet consisting primarily of plant matter, the most important of which are leafy greens. Spring greens, endive, kale, rocket, Chinese leaf, and watercress are all suitable vegetables, as are butternut squash, pea shoots, bell peppers, and many other plants. It is important to check before feeding something new to a bearded dragon, as some things can be toxic to them or will act to bind calcium in their diet, preventing them from being able to absorb calcium. The main things to avoid often contain oxalates and goitrogens. This diet is also seasonal, meaning that it changes with the availability of live prey in the wild. Studies of wild Pogona vitticeps have shown that termites comprise over 60% of the stomach contents of those studied. Bearded dragons, like many reptiles, are opportunistic and will binge feed on live food sources where available, preferring live prey over plant matter. Bearded dragons also require supplements to stay healthy, including calcium, vitamin D, and a multivitamin. These supplements are typically powdered and are administered by dusting their food with them.

Common health issues 
Although bearded dragons are fairly resilient to illness, improper care can potentially fatally hurt a bearded dragon. Some health issues that bearded dragons may have include metabolic bone disease, adenovirus, impaction, polarisation, dystocia, Yellow Fungus Disease and parasites. The majority of health issues bearded dragons face in captivity are due to poor diet and inadequate heat and lighting.

Metabolic bone disease 
Metabolic bone disease (MBD) is a collective term for several common diseases/illnesses that can be fatal and is probably the most common health problem of bearded dragons. A main attribute of MBD is the weakening of the skeletal structure and possible deformation. It occurs in bearded dragons due to malnutrition or the use of improper lighting, meaning they are unable to properly assimilate calcium from their diet or there isn't enough in their diet. Most bearded dragons in captivity will be fed supplementation and all will need a UVB light to enable them to properly use calcium in their diet. Typical foods that bearded dragons eat, including kale, mustard greens, and collard greens, are high in calcium and should be eaten daily along with other leafy greens and vegetables to have a well-balanced diet. Bearded dragons require UVB lights to process calcium in their diet. Without processing this calcium, their bodies will use calcium from their bones, therefore weakening them. Symptoms seen in bearded dragons with MBD include bumps in the legs, twitches or tremors, bumps along the spine or tail, a swollen bottom jaw, and jerky movements.

Hypocalcemia 
Hypocalcemia occurs when there are low levels of calcium in the bearded dragon's blood. Hypocalcemia is most often tied to metabolic bone disease. Low levels of calcium can result in twitching muscles, or seizures. Hypocalcemia is most often seen in young bearded dragons, as they are slightly more fragile than adults. Maintaining a diet that consists of enough calcium is crucial to avoiding hypocalcemia as well as metabolic bone disease.

Impaction 
Impaction occurs often in bearded dragons when they are fed food that is too big for them. Bearded dragons will try to eat worms or crickets that are too big for them, but this can be extremely harmful. Food should not be bigger than the space between their eyes for a young dragon. Older dragons can generally cope with larger insects but not oversized prey. If a dragon eats food that is too big for it, pressure will be put on its spinal cord during digestion. This pressure can lead to impaction which can lead to death. Another cause of impaction in captivity is ingestion of the substrate, commonly sand or other loose substrates.

Upper Respiratory Infection (URI) 
In bearded dragons, respiratory infection (RI) is caused by a bacterial infection in the lungs. Bearded dragons develop a respiratory infection due to a number of reasons such as incorrect lighting and temperature, high humidity, prolonged psychological stress, and poor captive conditions.

Atadenovirus 
Atadenovirus (ADV), also referred to as adenovirus, is a viral disease that can be deadly. ADV can be spread between reptiles through contact alone. Most juvenile ADV-positive bearded dragons do not live past 90 days. While ADV-positive adults will live longer, they eventually contract liver diseases. Common symptoms of ADV-positive bearded dragons include stunted growth and slow weight gain. Because of their compromised immune systems, ADV-positive bearded dragons may be infected with intestinal parasites.

Lighting 
Bearded dragons require UVB to enable vitamin D3 synthesis and to prevent illnesses like metabolic bone disease. Vitamin D3 is essential to calcium absorption, with calcium playing a major role in various critical biological functions. Bearded dragons also require UVA, which stimulates feeding, breeding, basking and overall health. They also require a basking heat source, most commonly a light-emitting source, to provide a basking area. Heat and UV are both vital to the bearded dragons' biological function.

Gallery

See also 
 Chlamydosaurus
 Leopard gecko

References

Further reading 
Storr GM. 1982. "Revision of the Bearded Dragons (Lacertilia: Agamidae) of Western Australia with Notes on the Dismemberment of the Genus Amphibolurus ".  Rec. Western Australia Mus. 10 (2): 199–214. (Pogona, new genus, p. 201).

External links 

 
Lizard genera
Agamid lizards of Australia
Taxa named by Glen Milton Storr
Reptiles as pets